Malby Brabazon (1588-1637)  was an Irish politician.

Brabazon was born in County Roscommon and educated at Trinity College, Dublin. He was MP for Bangor from the opening of parliament on 14 July 1634 until his death on 20 May 1637.

References

Alumni of Trinity College Dublin
Members of the Parliament of Ireland (pre-1801) for County Down constituencies
Irish MPs 1634–1635
People from County Roscommon
1637 deaths
1588 births